Grapevine chrome mosaic virus (GCMV) is a plant pathogenic virus of the family Secoviridae.

References

External links 
 ICTVdB—The Universal Virus Database: Grapevine chrome mosaic virus
 Family Groups—The Baltimore Method

Nepoviruses
Viral grape diseases